Semipalatinsk Oblast may refer to:
Semipalatinsk Oblast, Russia (1854–1920), an administrative division of the Russian Empire and the early Russian SFSR
Semipalatinsk Oblast, Kazakhstan (1939–1997), an administrative division of the Kazakh SSR and the Republic of Kazakhstan